Benjamin Franklin Howell (January 27, 1844 – February 1, 1933) was an American Republican Party politician who represented  in the United States House of Representatives from 1895 to 1911.

Early life and education
Born in Cedarville, New Jersey, Howell attended the common schools, and graduated from Fort Edward Institute, New York. He enlisted in the Twelfth Regiment, New Jersey Volunteers, in 1862 and served until the close of the war. He engaged in mercantile pursuits in South Amboy, New Jersey, 1865 and was named to the Township Committee, and served as Surrogate of Middlesex County from 1882 to 1892. He served as president of the People's National Bank of New Brunswick, vice president of the New Brunswick Savings Institution, and was a founder and vice president of the First National Bank of South Amboy (now known as Amboy Bank).

Congress
Howell was elected as a Republican to the Fifty-fourth and to the seven succeeding Congresses, serving in office from March 4, 1895 to March 3, 1911. He served as chairman of the Committee on Immigration and Naturalization (Fifty-eighth through Sixty-first Congresses). He was an unsuccessful candidate for reelection in 1910 to the Sixty-second Congress.

He served as a delegate to the 1896 Republican National Convention. 
He served as a member of the United States Immigration Commission 1907–1910.

Death
He died at the age of 89 at his home in New Brunswick, New Jersey, February 1, 1933, and was interred in Christ Cemetery, South Amboy, New Jersey.

References

External links

Benjamin Franklin Howell at The Political Graveyard

1844 births
1933 deaths
American people of Welsh descent
People from Lawrence Township, Cumberland County, New Jersey
Politicians from New Brunswick, New Jersey
People from South Amboy, New Jersey
Union Army personnel
Republican Party members of the United States House of Representatives from New Jersey